Christopher John Nevin (born 3 August 1975) is a former New Zealand cricketer, who played 37 One Day Internationals for New Zealand.

Domestic career
His entire state career has been played out with the Wellington Firebirds, as a wicketkeeper-batsman, normally opening the batting in one-day games.

He also briefly represented the Hampshire Cricket Board side in the Natwest Trophy, having played 4 seasons of club cricket in England for the Liphook and Ripsley Cricket Club.

References

External links
 

1975 births
Living people
New Zealand cricketers
New Zealand One Day International cricketers
Wellington cricketers
Cricketers from Dunedin
Hampshire Cricket Board cricketers
People educated at Hutt Valley High School
North Island cricketers
Wicket-keepers